Oak Creek is a creek that drains Bear Swamp Pond and flows into Schenevus Creek in East Worcester, New York.

References

Rivers of New York (state)
Rivers of Otsego County, New York